Olive Stokes Mix (April 10, 1887 – November 1, 1972) was an American actress.

Early life 

Olive M. Stokes was born in Indian Territory, the daughter of James Henry Stokes (1861–1904) and Georgia Ann Russell (1868–1939), later known as Georgia Brown. Her parents ran a ranch near Dewey, Oklahoma. Her mother was Cherokee, and Olive Stokes was enrolled as "Cherokee by blood". She graduated from Ward-Belmont College in 1907.

Career 
As a young woman, Olive Stokes helped run her family's ranch and her mother's boarding house for oil workers.

In her later years, Mix wrote a biography of her late ex-husband, The Fabulous Tom Mix (1957), and invested in oil wells and mines, including a uranium mine in Utah. In 1962 she was interviewed in a CBC Radio program, The Unreal West.

Personal life 
Olive Stokes married western film star Tom Mix in 1909, as his third wife (or second, by his count); they divorced in 1917. They had a daughter, Ruth Mix (1912–1977), who also acted in Westerns. Olive Stokes Mix died in 1972, aged 85 years, in Los Angeles, California. Her grandson Hick Hill was an actor in 1960 Westerns.

References

External links 

 
 The Tom Mix Museum in Dewey, Oklahoma (official website)

1887 births
1972 deaths
People from Dewey, Oklahoma
American silent film actresses
20th-century American actresses
Native American actresses
Cherokee Nation artists
20th-century Native Americans
20th-century Native American women